Edward Mark W Bennett (born 9 April 1979) is an English actor.

Early life
Bennett was born in Honeybourne, Worcestershire. He attended Chipping Campden School in Gloucestershire, and graduated from Cardiff University with a BSc in history and politics. He attended the Royal Academy of Dramatic Art (RADA).

Career
In 2008, Bennett appeared as Laertes in Hamlet, Demetrius in A Midsummer Night's Dream, and Berowne in Love's Labour's Lost. He reprised the first two roles when the productions toured London's Novello Theatre from December 2008 to February 2009, understudying for Hamlet and performing the role from 8 December 2008 until 2 January 2009 whilst David Tennant was undergoing surgery for a spinal injury.

In 2014, Bennett was appointed the Patron of Chapel Lane Theatre Company based in Stratford-Upon-Avon, UK.

Awards
Ian Charleson Awards 2007  Special Commendation for Dick Gurvil in Nan, Victor Bretherton in Diana of Dobson's (Orange Tree), Freddy Eynsford-Hill in Pygmalion (Peter Hall Co), and Roderigo in Othello (Donmar Warehouse)
Ian Charleson Awards 2008  Won second place for roles in Hamlet and Love's Labours Lost (RSC)

Stage

Filmography

Film

Television

References

External links
Edward-Bennett.com fanpage with gallery

RADA Profile
chapellane.co.uk Chapel Lane Theatre Company

English male stage actors
Royal Shakespeare Company members
Alumni of RADA
Alumni of Cardiff University
Living people
1979 births